Teruo Kakuta (born February 18), pen name , is a Japanese manga artist and creator of . His pen name is a multilingual pun, meaning "little insect" in Japanese and "condom" in English. Kondom's manga stories are centred around anthropomorphized creatures such as insects, amphibians, and reptiles. He is married to fellow manga artist

Career
Kondom is best known for his long-running Bondage Fairies manga series. The series began in 1990 as Insect Hunter, but it was quickly banned from sale by the Tokyo Metropolitan Ordinance. Under a new title, the manga was serialized in Sexploitation manga magazine Lemon Kids. In 1994, Antarctic Press localized Bondage Fairies through their Venus Comics imprint, and began publishing the manga in comic book instalments. It was later published by Studio Proteus and Eros Comics, along with sequel series The New Bondage Fairies, Bondage Fairies Extreme, and Fairy Fetish.

In recent decades, Kondom's erotic short manga Keyhole reached memetic status online. The story revolves around a doorknob, interpreted as a young woman, interacting with a homeowner's key. Keyhole was drawn in the late 1990s but published in Kondom's 2005 story collection . In 2012, Keyhole was adapted into a feature-length adult video, retitled "I'm a Doorknob...": Keyhole Pu*sy.

Selected works
  (20 February 1990)
  (5 April 1993)
  (20 October 1993)
  or The New Bondage Fairies (25 November 1994)
  or Bondage Fairies Extreme (25 September 1995)
  (10 November 2004)
  (20 July 2005)

References

Living people
Hentai creators
Manga artists
Year of birth missing (living people)